Beatriz Escribano (born 4 May 1990) is a Spanish handball player for Nantes Loire Atlantique Handball since June 2015 and the Spanish national team.

References

1990 births
Living people
Spanish female handball players
People from Ciudad Real
Sportspeople from the Province of Ciudad Real
Expatriate handball players
Spanish expatriate sportspeople in France
Competitors at the 2013 Mediterranean Games
Mediterranean Games competitors for Spain
21st-century Spanish women